Asian Institute of Public Health University is a Privately operated Public health university located in Bhubaneswar, Odisha, India. It was established in 2008 to bring the much needed expertise in various domains of public health to Odisha, emerging from close to two decades of community, hospital, and laboratory-based research and training in public health & expanding its contribution to a larger audience in the rest of country and in the neighboring Asian countries sharing population health problems of similar nature and magnitude. It was later conferred with university status after the AIPH University, Odisha Bill, 2017 was passed by the Odisha Legislative Assembly. It is the first Public health institute of India & the only entity in the country conducting public health education, research and service with expertise in all major domains of public health as well as the only institution that imparts required education at Masters and PhD level in the major domains of public health and conducts population-based hospital and laboratory research. The university has collaborated with well known Indian & global healthcare associations like AIIMS New Delhi, ICMR, WHO, UNICEF, London School of Hygiene & Tropical Medicine etc.

Campuses

City Campus 
EAST Campus, Prachi Vihar,
Anantapur, Phulnakhara,
Pin-754101

Main Campus 
1001 Haridamada, Jatani

Near IIT Bhubaneswar

Academics

Undergraduate Courses 
 Business administration
 Operation Theatre Technology
 Optometry
 Radiation & Imaging Technology

Postgraduate Courses 
 Public health
 Microbiology
 Life Science
 Zoology
 Botany
 Virology
 Healthcare Management 
 Hospital information system
 Physiotherapy

Ph.D Courses 
 Cancer Epidemiology
 Environmental Health
 Child Health
 Infectious Diseases
 Molecular Biology
 Data Analytics and Disease Modeling

Research Centres 

 One Health Center for Surveillance and Disease Dynamics
 Center for Disease Epidemiology and Surveillance 
 Center for Environment and Occupational Health 
 Center for Elderly Health 
 Center for Health and Public Policy 
 Health Promotion and Behavioral Health Center

Collaborations

National 

 AIIMS New Delhi
 Govt Of Odisha
 ICMR
 NHM
 ICMR- NICPR
 Department of Scientific & Industrial Research

International 

 WHO
 UNICEF
 Emory Rollins school of Public Health
 London School of Hygiene & Tropical Medicine
 UC Davis
 Duke University
 Bill & Melinda Gates Foundation
 National Institutes of Health
 Department for International Development
 University of Oklahoma

References

External links

Private universities in India
Universities in Bhubaneswar
Educational institutions established in 2018
2018 establishments in Odisha